The Ghadīr Khumm was a gathering of Muslims to attend a sermon delivered by the Islamic prophet Muhammad on 16 March 632 CE (18 Dhu al-Hijjah 10 AH). The gathering is said to have taken place at the Ghadir Khumm, located near the then settlement of al-Juhfa on the path between Mecca and Medina, where Muhammad halted the caravan of Muslims returning from the Farewell Pilgrimage.

In the sermon, made shortly before his death in June 632 CE (11 AH), Muhammad made a declaration in favor of Ali ibn Abi Talib, his cousin and son-in-law, uttering the words, "He whose  I am, Ali is his ." Shia Muslims believe this to be a clear indication that Ali was designated to lead the Muslim community after Muhammad and celebrate the anniversary of the event as Eid al-Ghadir. The Sunni community meanwhile regards the declaration as a simple affirmation of Muhammad's esteem for Ali.

Etymology

Ghadir Khumm refers both to the gathering of Muslims for Muhammad's sermon and its location, which was a pond fed by a nearby spring in a wadi known as Khumm, situated between Mecca and Medina. The valley is believed to have been located near the settlement of al-Juhfa, a strategic trijunction where routes from Medina, Egypt, and Iraq intersected.

Some sources give the etymology that Khumm means 'deceiver', and the valley was so named because the water of the pond was saline and unfit for consumption. At the time of the event, the original inhabitants of the region, namely, the Banu Khuza'a and Banu Kinana tribes, had already abandoned the area due to its poor pasturage and harsh climate. Before Muhammad's address, the location was likely never used as a caravan stop. In Shia sources, the harsh environment of Khumm may signify that Muhammad was tasked with an urgent announcement there, or that he wanted to brand the moment in the memories, or that he wanted many witnesses before the pilgrims parted their ways.

Background

Ten years after Muhammad's migration to Medina and on the last days of Dhu al-Qadah, Muhammad performed the Hajj rituals in Mecca shortly before his death. This Hajj ceremony has become known as the Farewell Pilgrimage. In his sermon in Mecca (at Arafat) and again later at the Ghadir Khumm by some accounts, Muhammad alerted Muslims about his impending death. After the Hajj, he set off on the return journey from Mecca to Medina, accompanied by an entourage of Muslims. The announcement at the Ghadir Khumm took place during the return journey among a congregation of these Muslims, possibly numbering in the tens of thousands.

The sermon
At the Ghadir Khumm, Muhammad called the Muslim caravan to a halt ahead of the noon congregational prayer, before the pilgrims parted to go their separate ways, asking for a dais to be raised, shaded by palm branches. After the prayer, Muhammad delivered a sermon to a large number of Muslims in which, as related in the Hadith al-Thaqalayn, he emphasized the importance of two things: the Qur'an, and his ahl al-bayt (his family). This hadith is widely reported by Sunni and Shia authorities. The version that appears in Musnad Ibn Hanbal, a canonical Sunni source, is as follows:

Muhammad might have repeated this statement on multiple occasions, and there are several slightly different versions of this hadith in Sunni sources. For instance, the version that appears in as-Sunan al-kubra, another canonical Sunni source, also includes the warning, "Be careful how you treat the two [treasures] after me." Then, taking Ali by the hand, Muhammad asked if he was not closer to the believers than they were to themselves, possibly a reference to verse 33:6 of the Qur'an. When they affirmed, the prophet declared,

which is known as the Hadith of Walaya in Shia. Muhammad might have repeated this sentence three or four more times, as reported in Musnad Ibn Hanbal. He then continued, "O God, befriend the friend of Ali and be the enemy of his enemy," according to some sources, including the Sunni Shawahid al-tanzil and the Shia Nahj al-haqq. The Sunni Ibn Kathir and also Ahmad ibn Hanbal in his musnad relate that Muhammad's companion Umar congratulated Ali after the sermon and told him, "You have now become  of every faithful man and woman."

Historical accounts

The historicity of the Ghadir Khumm is rarely disputed within the Muslim community, as its recorded tradition is "among the most extensively acknowledged and substantiated" in classical Islamic sources, even as the statements made at the event remain open to interpretation. Several variations exist in the classical sources, and there is a significant weight of different accounts. The narrative of the Ghadir Khumm is for instance preserved in Chronology of Ancient Nations by the Sunni al-Biruni, which survives in an early fourteenth-century Ilkhanid copy by Ibn al-Kutbi. The Shia inclinations of those responsible for this copy are evident from its illustrations of Ali, including one entitled The Investiture of Ali at Ghadir Khumm.

Accounts of the Ghadir Khumm appear elsewhere in both Sunni and Shia canonical works of hadith, and these accounts have at times been used interchangeably without sectarian prejudice. The Shia scholar Amini, for instance, relied on Sunni sources to list over a hundred companions and eighty-four  who had recounted the event, most of whom are now counted as Sunnis. Similar efforts were made by the Shia authors Musavi and Mahfouz. Some of the best accounts of the event include those by the historian Ya'qubi, a sympathizer to the Alid cause, and by the Sunni historian Ibn Asakir, and also the accounts preserved in the collections of hadith, such as the canonical one by Ibn Hanbal. A great number of related hadiths about the Ghadir Khumm were also collected together with their s by the Sunni Ibn Kathir. To this list of Sunni sources, Jafri adds the s of al-Tirmidhi, al-Nasa'i, Ibn Maja, Abu Dawud, and the works of Ibn al-Athir, Ibn Abd al-Barr, Ibn Abd Rabbih, and Jahiz.

Some authors, such as al-Tabari, Ibn Hisham, and Ibn Sa'd nevertheless made little or no mention of the Ghadir Khumm, perhaps because the story seem to justify the Shia claims. Alternatively, it is probable that these writers abstained from commenting on the event to avoid angering their Sunni rulers by supporting the Shia claims about Ali's right to succession. Western authors, whose works were based on these authors, consequently make little reference to the Ghadir Khumm. Even though the Ghadir Khumm is absent from Tarikh al-Tabari, its Sunni author narrates that Muhammad publicly dismissed some complaints about the conduct of Ali in Yemen in the same "chronological slot" as the Ghadir Khumm and from an authority about the event. Maria M. Dakake suggests that the author deliberately replaced the Ghadir Khumm hadith with another one in praise of Ali but without any spiritual and legitimist implications in favor of Shia. Similarly, as a senior employee of the Shia Buyids, al-Sharif al-Radi does not mention the Ghadir Khumm in his Nahj al-Balagha, possibly to avoid the ire of the Sunni Abbasids. Shah-Kazemi writes that some among the Ahl al-Hadith in the third-century (ninth-century) Baghdad denied the event, which al-Tabari attempted to refute in his nonextant al-Walaya, or his unfinished Kitab al-Fada'il.

Links to the Qur'an

In Shia and some Sunni sources, two verses of the Qur'an are associated with the Ghadir Khumm: verse 5:3, which announces the perfection of Islam, and verse 5:67, which urges Muhammad to fulfill his divine instructions. The latter is sometimes known as the Verse of Tabligh, linked to the Ghadir Khumm by the Sunni al-Suyuti and al-Razi and the Shia al-Qumi, among others. The verse warns Muhammad, 

Verse 5:3 of the Qur'an, known as the Verse of Ikmal al-Din, is similarly linked to the Ghadir Khumm by the Sunni al-Tabari and al-Baghdadi and the Shia al-Tusi, among others. In contrast, Ya'qubi and most Sunni commentators associate this verse with the Farewell Pilgrimage. This verse includes the passage:

Other literary references
The narrative of the Ghadir Khumm has also been preserved in the Arabic literature. The earliest instance, according to Veccia Vaglieri and Jafri, is a disputed poem attributed to Hassan ibn Thabit, who accompanied Muhammad during the pilgrimage. According to Jafri, this poem has been preserved by Shia and some Sunni sources. It includes the verse, "Stand up, O Ali, for I find only you to be an Imam and a guide after I [Muhammad] depart." In regards to its authenticity, Amir-Moezzi does not find the attribution problematic, while Jafri considers it highly improbable that these events would have passed unrecorded by Ibn Thabit, who was the "official poet-reporter of Muhammad." The Shia al-Kumayt ibn Zayd is another early poet who composed verses on the same theme.

Interpretation

While the authenticity of the Ghadir Khumm is not contested, its interpretation is a source of controversy between Sunni and Shia.  is a polysemous Arabic word, the meanings of which have varied in different periods and contexts. Before the Islamic era, the term originally applied to any form of tribal association. Later, the word was used in the Qur'an and the hadith literature with different meanings, including 'Lord', 'trustee', and 'helper'. In the context of the Ghadir Khumm, however, the interpretation of the word  tends to be split along sectarian lines. As such, Shias view the Ghadir Khumm as the investiture of Ali with Muhammad's religious and political authority, while Sunnis regard it as a statement about the rapport between the two men, or that Ali should execute Muhammad's will.   

On one occasion during his caliphate, Ali is known to have asked Muslims to come forward with their testimonies about the Ghadir Khumm. In doing so, McHugo suggests, Ali publicly claimed to have been entrusted by Muhammad with a spiritual and political authority greater than others, particularly his predecessors. The views of Madelung and Shah-Kazemi are similar. According to Lesley Hazleton, an author on religion and politics, Muhammad's statement at the Ghadir Khumm, "O God, befriend the friend of Ali and be the enemy of his enemy," was the standard formula for pledging allegiance in the Middle East at that time. Ali and his son Hasan both demanded a similar pledge of their supporters during their caliphates. The hadith of Ghadir Khumm is also cited by Ammar ibn Yasir, a companion of Ali, to support his right to the caliphate in the account of the Shia historian Ibn A'tham al-Kufi (ninth century) about the negotiations before the Battle of Siffin (657). This appears to be the earliest such instance in historical sources.

Shia view

For Shia Muslims, the Ghadir Khumm signifies the investiture of Ali with the guardianship of the Muslim community after Muhammad. In particular, for them this was his most public announcement about the succession of Ali.

For Shias, the dramatic announcement at the Ghadir Khumm to thousands of Muslims in the heat of day hardly support its Sunni interpretation of love and support for Ali. These two are the obligations of every Muslim towards other Muslims, not just Ali, thus weakening the Sunni interpretation again. Alternatively, the Sunni Ibn Kathir considers the Ghadir Khumm a response to the complaints about Ali during his expedition to Yemen, while the Shia Ibn Shahrashub counters that Muhammad had already dismissed those objections, "Do not complain about Ali, for he is sternly scrupulous only for the sake of God."

About the linked Qu'ranic verses, Tabatabai, the author of the seminal Shia exegesis al-Mizan, attempts to prove in his work that "today" in the Verse of Ikmal (5:3) is the day of the Ghadir Khumm. Noting the despair of unbelievers and the enemies of Islam in this verse, he argues that this despair must have followed the appointment of Ali to rightly guide the nascent Muslim community after the prophet. He adds that the perfection of religion in the verse is the guardianship of Ali and the fulfillment of an earlier divine promise in verse 24:55 of the Qur'an. Similar views are given by other Shia theologians. 

Regarding the Verse of Tabligh (5:67), Shia exegeses suggest that Muhammad was concerned about implementing his divine instructions to announce Ali as his successor, fearing the reaction of some of his companions. It was only after the revelation of this verse that Muhammad gave his sermon at the Ghadir Khumm, according to these sources. Hossein Nasr and his coauthors view as "most plausible" a link between the Verse of Tabligh and the events that followed the Farewell Pilgrimage, including the Ghadir Khumm. Their justification is that chapter five of the Qur'an is often associated with Muhammad's final years in Medina.

Sunni view
Among Sunni Muslims, the Ghadir Khumm is not associated with the succession to Muhammad. Instead, the event is often connected with Ali's campaign in Yemen, from which he had just returned prior to the Farewell Pilgrimage. Ali is said to have strictly imposed the Islamic guidelines for a fair distribution of booty which reportedly angered some soldiers. The Sunni historian Ibn Kathir, for instance, sides with Ali in his account of the episode but also suggests that the Ghadir Khumm sermon was simply intended as a public declaration of Muhammad's love and esteem for Ali in light of the earlier events. Accepting this explanation as such, that Muhammad equated Ali with himself in an extraordinary announcement at the Ghadir Khumm still provides a strong basis for the Shia claims, suggests Jafri.

For Sunnis, it is also unimaginable that most companions would act wrongly and ignore a clear appointment of Ali at the Ghadir Khumm. Shaban and Poonawala suggest that the Muslim community did not act as if they had heard about it, and Shaban and Lewis thus consider this designation improbable. In contrast, Amir-Moezzi writes that the Shia Amini has compiled volumes of Sunni and Shia historical evidence, in support of the Shia interpretation of the Ghadir Khumm. Noting that Abu Bakr designated Umar to succeed him, Lalani also suggests that Muhammad did appoint a successor but his choice was ignored by the community. The view of Abbas is similar, and the Shia view is also that the community ignored the designation of Ali. They add that numerical strength cannot be a factor in a tribal community where decisions are made by tribal leaders, and that majority does not imply legitimacy in the Qur'an. Some have instead argued that Muhammad would have made such an important announcement earlier at Hajj, while Abbas views this as criticizing Muhammad's judgement.  

Sunni commentators also argue that the Verse of Ikmal (5:3) refers to either the establishment of the rites for Hajj during the Farewell Pilgrimage or the closure of Islamic legislation with the revelation of dietary instructions in the remainder of this verse. Most Sunni scholars meanwhile link the Verse of Tabligh (6:67) to Muhammad's precarious position in Mecca during the early years of Islam, or his interactions with the People of the Book (adherents of earlier monotheistic faiths), while Nasr et al. consider it more likely that this verse is associated with the Farewell Pilgrimage or the Ghadir Khumm.

Eid al-Ghadir 

While 18 Dhu al-Hijjah is not a significant day on the Sunni calendar, Shia Muslims celebrate this day as the Eid al-Ghadir, the day on which Islam was completed as a religion by the appointment of Ali as Muhammad's successor. Shias honor the holiday by making pilgrimages to Karbala.

See also

References

Citations

Sources

External links 

Ghadir Khumm academic summary and reading list - from Oxford Bibliographies

632
7th-century Islam
Shia days of remembrance
Ali
History of Islam
Shia Islam
History of Shia Islam